Tawny Newsome (born February 24, 1983) is an American musician, comedian, and actress best known for playing Chelsea Leight-Leigh on Bajillion Dollar Propertie$, co-starring in Space Force and the third season of Brockmire, and co-hosting the podcast Yo, Is This Racist?. She is also a singer in the band Four Lost Souls. She voices one of the main characters, Beckett Mariner, on Star Trek: Lower Decks.

Early life
Originally from Vacaville, California, where she grew up on a ranch, Newsome attended DePaul Theatre School in Chicago, where she started her comedy career with Second City.

Career 
Newsome was a backup singer in a touring Talking Heads tribute band. This later led to her being cast in Documentary Now! in a similar role.

Newsome's first major television roles were as Chelsea Leight-Leigh on Bajillion Dollar Propertie$ and Nina on The Comedy Get Down.

Newsome has been a co-host of the podcast Yo, Is This Racist? alongside Andrew Ti since 2018. She also appears as a frequent guest on podcasts such as Comedy Bang! Bang! and Spontaneanation with Paul F. Tompkins.

Newsome is also a musician and is a member of the band Four Lost Souls alongside Jon Langford, Bethany Thomas, and John Szymanski. The group released a debut self-titled album in 2017.

Newsome was in the main cast of Brockmire in its third season. She was also cast in the 2019 ABC pilot Woman Up. She was cast as a lead voice in the CBS All Access series Star Trek: Lower Decks.

She appears in a lead role as Maj. Angela Ali in the Netflix series Space Force starting in 2020.

Since 2020, Newsome has co-hosted Star Trek: The Pod Directive, the official Star Trek podcast, along with comedian Paul F. Tompkins.

Filmography

References

External links 

 
 

Living people
1983 births
American television actresses
American women comedians
Actresses from California
Comedians from California
21st-century American actresses
21st-century American comedians
People from Vacaville, California
American women podcasters